Afraflacilla roberti is a jumping spider that lives in Kenya.

References

Endemic fauna of Kenya
Salticidae
Spiders described in 2011
Spiders of Africa
Fauna of Kenya